The Galliano Pontoon Bridge crosses Bayou Lafourche in the town of Galliano, Louisiana.  Built in 1956, and rehabilitated in 2009, this pontoon swing bridge has a total length of 136.2 feet with its largest span at 71.9 feet.  The bridge deck is 24.9 feet wide.

References

Road bridges in Louisiana
Pontoon bridges in the United States
Swing bridges in the United States
Buildings and structures in Lafourche Parish, Louisiana
1956 establishments in Louisiana
Bridges completed in 1956